On November 3, 1992, the District of Columbia held an election for its non-voting House delegate representing the District of Columbia's at-large congressional district. The winner of the race was Eleanor Holmes Norton (D), who won her first re-election. All elected members would serve in 103rd United States Congress.

The delegate is elected for two-year terms.

Candidates 
Eleanor Holmes Norton, a Democrat, sought election for her second term to the United States House of Representatives. Norton was opposed in this election by Republican challenger Susan Emerson who received 10.22%. This resulted in Norton being re-elected with 84.78% of the vote.

Results

See also
 United States House of Representatives elections in the District of Columbia

References 

United States House 
District of Columbia
1992